Tentaoculus perlucidus is a species of small sea snail, a marine gastropod mollusk in the family Pseudococculinidae, the false limpets.

Distribution
This marine species is endemic to New Zealand.

References

External links
 To Encyclopedia of Life
 To World Register of Marine Species

Pseudococculinidae
Gastropods described in 1976